People in Ecstasy is a 1921 German silent film directed by Julius Geisendörfer and starring Conrad Veidt.

Cast
 Conrad Veidt as Professor Munk, Komponist
 Grete Berger as Maria, seine Frau
 Fritz Alberti as Feld, Operndirektor
 Robert Garrison as Hamburger, Theateragent
 Julius Geisendörfer as Anton, ein Zuhälter
 Gussy Holl
 Atti Ottendörfer
 Aenne Ullstein
 Heinz Ullstein
 Klara von Mühlen

References

Bibliography
 John T. Soister. Conrad Veidt on Screen: A Comprehensive Illustrated Filmography. McFarland, 2002.

External links

1921 films
Films of the Weimar Republic
German silent feature films
Films directed by Richard Oswald
German black-and-white films
1920s German films